Velero Bridge, also known as "El Velero", is a bridge in Guayaquil, Ecuador. One of the prominent landmarks of the city, especially when lit up at night, it was inaugurated on July 27, 2005. It forms part of the route of the Guayaquil Marathon.

References

Bridges in Ecuador
Buildings and structures in Guayaquil
Bridges completed in 2005